Gharib Afifi was an Egyptian boxer. He competed in the 1948 Summer Olympics.

1948 Olympic results
 Round of 32: lost to Peter Foran of Ireland by decision.

References

Year of birth missing
1990s deaths
Boxers at the 1948 Summer Olympics
Egyptian male boxers
Olympic boxers of Egypt
Mediterranean Games gold medalists for Egypt
Mediterranean Games medalists in boxing
Boxers at the 1951 Mediterranean Games
Welterweight boxers
20th-century Egyptian people